MotoTrans is a Spanish company which produced motorcycles and scooters between 1957 and 1983 when it was bought by Yamaha.

MotoTrans was famous for licensing Ducati engines and using them in MotoTrans motorcycles as well as building Ducati motorcycles incorporating small differences.

Motorcycle manufacturers of Spain
Ducati (company)